Turres in Numidia is a titular see in Numidia of the Roman Catholic Church.

The diocese of Turres in Numidia was located in the Roman province of Numidia, Roman North Africa, but ceased to function in the 7th century with the Muslim conquest of the Maghreb.  The location of the cathedra and seat of the Bishopric remains unknown, though thought to be in  present-day Tunisia or Algeria.

The current bishop is Francisco de Paula Victor of Brazil.

References

Former populated places in Algeria
Ancient Berber cities
Roman towns and cities in Algeria
Catholic titular sees in Africa